The Vermilion Range is a mountain range of the Canadian Rockies, in British Columbia, Canada. The range is west of the Vermilion River and east of the headwaters of the Kootenay River.

This range includes the following mountains and peaks:



References

See also
 Geography of British Columbia

Mountain ranges of British Columbia
Ranges of the Canadian Rockies
Kootenay Land District